Ong Eng Die (born 20 June 1910, date of death unknown), was a Chinese Indonesian politician and economist. Ong was born on 20 June 1910 in Gorontalo, Indonesia into the 'Cabang Atas' or the Chinese gentry of colonial Indonesia. His father, Ong Teng Hoen, served as Luitenant der Chinezen of Gorontalo, thus heading the local Chinese civil bureaucracy, from his appointment in 1924 until the Japanese invasion in 1942.

His privileged background allowed him access to Dutch schooling. He later studied at the University of Amsterdam's economics department in 1940 and obtained his doctorate at the same university in 1943 upon completing his dissertation Chineezen in Nederlandsch-Indië, een Sociografie van een Indonesische Bevolkingsgroep. In 1946 he returned to Indonesia and started work at the Central Bank of Indonesia in Yogyakarta. From 1947 to 1948 he was Deputy Minister of Finance in the administration of the first Prime Minister Amir Sjarifuddin. He was adviser to the Indonesian delegation during the negotiations that led to the Renville Agreement. He joined the Indonesian National Party (PNI) and in 1955 became Minister of Finance in the Ali Sastroamidjojo Cabinet. After his resignation, he was placed under house arrest on charges of corruption in August 1955.

He was arrested in 1957 on charges of corruption when he was Minister of Finance in the Ali Sastroamidjojo Cabinet. He was accused of providing credit, during his office, of 20,000,000 rupiah to Bank Umum Nasional in Bandung, a bank established by himself and others in 1952, in which he himself was a major shareholder. He returned to Amsterdam, Netherlands, in 1964. He and his German wife, Gertrud Wilhelmine Höhnerbach, were granted Dutch citizenship in 1967, when his occupation was listed as businessman. He and his wife continued to live in Amsterdam until their divorce in 1975, upon which he moved to The Hague. The couple had two sons.

References 

 Prominent Indonesian Chinese: Biographical Sketches oleh Leo Suryadinata

1910 births
Year of death missing
Cabang Atas
Finance Ministers of Indonesia
Indonesian people of Chinese descent
Indonesian Hokkien people
Chinese diaspora in Indonesia
Indonesian economists
University of Amsterdam alumni
Government ministers of Indonesia
Politicians from Gorontalo (province)